Ziaabad is a city in Qazvin Province, Iran.

Ziaabad or Zeyaabad or Ziyaabad may also refer to:
 Ziaabad, Golestan
 Ziaabad, Kerman
 Ziaabad, Komijan, Markazi Province
 Ziaabad, Shazand, Markazi Province
 Ziaabad District, in Qazvin Province